Vinski Vrh is a settlement in the vineyard-covered Slovene Hills northeast of Ormož in northeastern Slovenia. The area belongs to the traditional region of Styria. It is now included in the Drava Statistical Region.

References

External links
Vinski Vrh on Geopedia

Populated places in the Municipality of Ormož